Ivan Pešić (born 7 July 1989) is a Serbian football midfielder.

Early career
Ivan Pešić was born in Čačak, SR Serbia. He began his career in his native Serbia playing for FK Dragačevo before moving to FK Mladost Lučani in the Jelen SuperLiga. He moved to Belgrade 2008 and played with FK Bežanija. In 2011, he moved to Novi Pazar in Serbian SuperLiga, making his debut against FK Vojvodina.

Honours
Mladost Lučani
Serbian First League: 2013–14

References

 Profile at Srbijafudbal
 
 Profile at Utakmica.rs
 

1989 births
Living people
Sportspeople from Čačak
Serbian footballers
Association football midfielders
FK Bežanija players
FK Mladost Lučani players
FK Novi Pazar players
FK Borac Čačak players
Serbian First League players
Serbian SuperLiga players